The 1876 East Cumberland by-election was fought on 26 April 1876.  The byelection was fought due to the death of the incumbent Conservative MP, William Nicholson Hodgson.  It was won by the Liberal candidate Stafford Howard.

References

1876 in England
History of Cumberland
1876 elections in the United Kingdom
By-elections to the Parliament of the United Kingdom in Cumbria constituencies
19th century in Cumberland